The harpejji is an electric stringed musical instrument developed in 2007 by American audio engineer Tim Meeks. It can be described as a cross between a piano and a guitar, or as a cross between an accordion and a pedal steel guitar. The playing surface has a layout arranged in ascending whole tones across strings, and ascending semi-tones as the strings travel away from the player with a five octave range from A0 to A5. Harpejjis use an electronic muting system to dampen unfretted strings and minimize the impact of sympathetic vibrations.

About 500 harpejjis have been made as of 2019.

The harpejji is a descendant of the StarrBoard which was developed in the 1980s. 
Its name is a portmanteau from "harp" and "arpeggio".

Technique 
It is primarily played with a two handed tapping technique. It differs from other tapping instruments, such as the Chapman Stick, by way of the orientation of the instrument to the player.  The instrument rests on a stand like a keyboard, with the strings perpendicular to the player.  The instrument allows for the musician to use all 10 fingers to fret the strings, and a single hand can cover a two octave range.  New techniques for playing the instrument are beginning to surface, such as strumming with a pick. Unlike the piano, no formal pedagogy has been established for the harpejji.

Models 

The harpejji is manufactured by the inventor's company, Marcodi Musical Products.

The first harpejji model, the 24-string d1, was produced from January 2008 through May 2010.  It was subsequently replaced by the k24 which also has 24 strings. The latter model includes updates to the internal electronics, a simplification of the fretboard marker system, and a change from maple to bamboo as the primary wood for the instrument.  In January 2011, the g16, a smaller 16 string model with a four octave range (from C2 to C6) and mono output, was introduced.

Sizes

Players and recordings 
The first commercial harpejji recording was made by Jordan Rudess for the soundtrack to the God of War III video game. Rudess has also used the harpejji in the band Dream Theater.

The first all original harpejji album was released on March 23, 2021 by Lance Hoeppner. The album titled I AM Lance Vol.1, Harpejji Meets The Tempest, consisted of six songs written by Hoeppner and performed on the harpejji and DSI Tempest.

Stevie Wonder played his hit song "Superstition" on a 16 string harpejji on the 2012 Billboard Music Awards. Wonder has also used the harpejji in live performances, such as at the A Concert For Charlottesville in 2017. Wonder guested with the Dave Matthews Band and performed three songs with the instrument.

Two time Grammy and Oscar awards winner A. R. Rahman has used the harpejji in several of his recordings and live shows. His Oscar nominated song "If I Rise" from 127 Hours featured the instrument. In the opening episode of Season 3 of Coke Studio India, he played the harpejji in two songs: "Ennile Maha Oliyo" and "Jagao Mere Des."

The band Walk Off The Earth and guest Scott Helman can be seen playing the harpejji in their music video cover for "Can't Feel My Face". The video shows the four playing the instrument simultaneously.

Harry Connick Jr played a harpejji during a performance on episode 15 of season 19 of American Idol on April 19, 2021.

Jacob Collier and Cory Henry are also known to be proficient harpejji players.

References

External links 
 Website of harpejji's manufacturer
 YouTube channel by manufacturer

2007 introductions
Musical instruments invented in the 2000s
2007 establishments in the United States
American inventions
Fretboard tapping instruments
Amplified instruments